Lafayette Central Catholic Jr/Sr High School is a Roman Catholic secondary school serving grades 7–12 in Lafayette, Indiana.

History 
Central Catholic was founded in 1956.

In 1959, Senator John F. Kennedy brought his presidential campaign to Central Catholic. He spoke before thousands at a fund-raising dinner in McHale Gymnasium.

In 1990, citing a lack of support, money, and enrollment, CC threatened to close its doors. Former bishop, William Higi, announced in the spring of 1990 that CC's doors would close at the end of the school year. The announcement resulted in a strong showing of support from the principal at that time, Dave Worland, which eventually led to the reversal of the decision to close the school's doors.

Demographics
The demographic breakdown of the 440 students enrolled for the 2017–18 school year was:
 
 American Indian/Alaska Native - 0%
 Asian - 0.7%
 Black - 2.0%
 Hispanic - 6.4% 
 White - 90.9%
 Native Hawaiian/Pacific islander - 0%
 Two or more races - 0%

Athletics 
Central Catholic is currently a member of the Hoosier Athletic Conference. The following sports are offered at CC:

Baseball (boys)
State champion - 2003–04, 2006–07, 2008–09, 2009–10, 2010–11, 2011–12, 2012–13
Basketball (boys & girls)
Boys state champion - 1997–98, 1999–00, 2002-03
Girls state champion - 2005–06, 2014–15, 2015–16
Bowling (co-ed)
Cross country (co-ed)
Football (boys)
State champion - 1976–77, 1999–00, 2009–10, 2010–11, 2011–12, 2012–13, 2015–16, 2019-20
Golf (boys & girls)
Gymnastics (girls)
Soccer (boys & girls)
Girls state champion - 2020-21

Softball (girls)
Swimming & diving (boys & girls)
Tennis (boys & girls)
Track & field (co-ed)
Volleyball (girls)
State champion - 2010–11, 2017–18, 2021-22
Wrestling (boys)

Notable alumni

See also
 List of high schools in Indiana

References

External links
 
 Lafayette Catholic School System
 Diocese of Lafayette-in-Indiana

Educational institutions established in 1956
Catholic secondary schools in Indiana
Private high schools in Indiana
Private middle schools in Indiana
Buildings and structures in Lafayette, Indiana
Schools in Tippecanoe County, Indiana
Roman Catholic Diocese of Lafayette in Indiana
1956 establishments in Indiana